Richard Clarke or Clerke (died 1634) was an eminent scholar, translator and preacher in the Anglican Church.

Clarke was educated at Christ's College, Cambridge and was a Fellow there from 1583 to 1598. He was appointed Vicar of Minster on 18 October 1597 and Monkton in Thanet. On 8 May 1602 he was appointed one of the Six Preachers of Canterbury Cathedral. He served in the First Westminster Company that was charged with translating the first twelve books of the King James Version of the Bible. A large folio volume of his sermons was published posthumously by Charles White, M.A., in London in 1637. His will included legacies to the Cathedral Library, to Christ's Hospital and to the parish of Minster-in-Thanet.

References

McClure, Alexander. (1858) The Translators Revived: A Biographical Memoir of the Authors of the English Version of the Holy Bible. Mobile, Alabama: R. E. Publications (republished by the Marantha Bible Society, 1984 ASIN B0006YJPI8 )
Nicolson, Adam. (2003) God's Secretaries: The Making of the King James Bible. New York: HarperCollins 

Year of birth missing
16th-century births
1634 deaths
Translators of the King James Version
17th-century English translators
Fellows of Christ's College, Cambridge
People from Minster-in-Thanet
17th-century English Anglican priests
16th-century English clergy
16th-century Anglican theologians
17th-century Anglican theologians